The canton of Macouria (French: Canton de Macouria) is one of the former cantons of the Guyane department in French Guiana. It was located in the arrondissement of Cayenne. Its administrative seat was located in Macouria, the canton's sole commune. Its population was 10,358 in 2012.

Administration

References 

Macouria